Desaiganj also known as Navi Wadsa (lit. New Wadsa) is a Large Village and a municipal council in the Wadsa taluka in Gadchiroli district in the state of Maharashtra, India. The village of Wadsa, now called Juni Wadsa (lit. Old Wadsa) lies 2 km to the south-west. The town is situated on the banks of river Wainganga.

Demographics
 Indian census, Desaiganj has a population of 28,781 of which 14,388 are males while 14,393 are females. Literacy rate of Desaiganj is 88.38% higher than state average of 82.34%. In Desaiganj, Male literacy is around 93.58% while female literacy rate is 83.22%. Population of children with age of 0-6 is 3064 which is 10.65% of total population of Desaiganj.

Marathi is the most widely spoken languages here.

Transport
It lies on National Highway-353C and National Highway-543. The town is served by Wadsa railway station, which lies on Chanda Fort–Gondia section of South East Central Railway.

References

Cities and towns in Gadchiroli district
Talukas in Maharashtra